The Otay Mesa East Port of Entry is a planned border crossing between San Diego and Tijuana, approximately 2 miles east of the existing Otay Mesa Port of Entry. The crossing will connect the Otay Centenario borough of Tijuana with East Otay Mesa in unincorporated San Diego County, an as-yet undeveloped area slotted for future development including a business park. Although the crossing will allow cars and pedestrians, it is mainly designed for trucks and commercial vehicles.

In July 2014, Mexican Undersecretary of Infrastructure of the Secretariat of Communications and Transportation Raúl Murrieta Cummings and the Secretary of the California Department of Transportation (Caltrans), Brian P. Kelly, signed a memorandum of understanding to build and put the new port of entry into operation. It was expected to be ready as early as 2017, and provide 27 northbound lanes from Tijuana to San Diego and 8 southbound lanes. The cost is estimated to be 2 billion Mexican pesos (about  million US dollars).

Construction has not started, with the lack of Mexican interest in the project due to the proposed toll.

External links
"Otay Mesa East Port of Entry / State Route 11 Presidential Permit Application", 2007, SANDAG and California Department of Transportation District 11

See also
 List of Mexico–United States border crossings
 List of Canada–United States border crossings

References

Ports of Entry in San Diego–Tijuana
Mexico–United States border crossings
Proposed infrastructure in North America